Felipe Peña Biafore (born 20 April 2001) is an Argentine professional footballer who plays as a midfielder for  Arsenal de Sarandí.

Career
Peña Biafore is product of River Plate's youth academy, having joined in 2012. On 14 February 2020, he signed his first professional contract with his childhood club. He made his professional debut with River Plate in a 2–1 Copa Libertadores win over Independiente Santa Fe on 19 May 2021; the game was noteworthy as River Plate was hit by a COVID-19 outbreak, resulting in them having no substitute players, and their outfielder Enzo Pérez had to play as goalkeeper.

References

External links
 

2001 births
Living people
Sportspeople from Buenos Aires Province
Argentine footballers
Association football midfielders
Club Atlético River Plate footballers